Mijos are a series of plastic collectible figurines created by David Gonzales. Representing various Chicano Mexican American youth characters, Mijos debuted in 2004 as a spin-off of Gonzales' Homies figures. The Mijos line (like Homies before them) are specifically targeted at Hispanics — in this case, Hispanic children.

Mijos come in two lines: as two-inch figurines sold in supermarket vending machines, and as six-inch figures manufactured by Toy Play and sold in stores like Walmart, Kmart, Target, and Toys "R" Us.

Description 
In their fictional world, Mijos are a group of tightly knit kids (mostly teens, but some younger children and even babies) growing up in Oaktown (a nickname for Oakland, California), and hanging out in "Mijo Park." (The term "mijo" is a conjoined Spanish slang word of affection, loosely translated as "my little one" ["Mi" + "hijo" = "my son"].) In a community surrounded by inner-city problems, the Mijos form a strong and binding cultural support system that enables them to overcome the surrounding negativity, allowing for laughter and good times as an antidote to reality. As befitting these characters from the barrio, many Mijos wear bandanas and baggy pants.

Characters 
The three main Mijos are Andres ("Lil Dre"), Monica ("Huera"), and Antonio ("Baby Boy"), inspired by Gonzales' real-life children. Though predominantly Chicano youth, some Mijos characters are of other ethnicities, like Puerto Rican, African American, and Caucasian. Gonzales has created a background story for each Mijo, which is available at the Mijos website.

 Andres ("Lil Dre")
 Angela ("Angelbaby")
 Antonio("Baby Boy")
 Bennie ("Bernardo")
 Brenda ("Brownie")
 Brian Downey ("B-Down")
 Carlos ("Crybaby")
 Carolina ("Payasa")
 Charlie ("Chorriyo")
 Chaz ("Chunky Chaz")
 Enrique ("Kiki")
 Esteban ("Spooky")
 Hector ("Hopper")
 Jaime ("Jito")
 Javier ("Tico")
 Juan ("Chico")
 Juan ("Tito")
 Juan ("Juanito") 
 Julian ("Bubba")
 Manuel ("Manny Moco")
 Marcos ("Mamon")
 Maria ("Baby Doll")
 Miguel ("Mousy")
 Monica ("Huera")
 Natalia ("Travieza")
 Pablo ("Poor Boy")
 Pancho ("Pancho Pedo")
 Pedro ("Pedro")
 Reggie ("Real Short")
 Reynaldo ("Nardo")
 Roberto ("Beto")
 Salvador ("Sal")
 Selena ("Ragdoll")
 Teresa ("Chica")

In other media 
Gonzales produced a Mijos comic strip which ran on the Homies website. Many of the strips were collected in books, including at least two published by Scholastic.

References

External links 
 

2000s toys
Products introduced in 2004
Toy brands
Toy figurines